Sultan Jaya Football Club (simply known as Sultan Jaya) is an Indonesian football club based in Makassar, South Sulawesi. They currently compete in the Liga 3.

History
Founded in 2018, Sultan Jaya made club debut into Indonesian football by joining the third-tier league Indonesian Liga 3 in 2019. In 2019, the club was registered as an official member of the Asprov PSSI of South Sulawesi and made their debut in the Indonesian League and they made it into the last 12 of the Liga 3 South Sulawesi zone.

Sponsorship
 Sultanjaya Group
 Group Jaya Khisma
 Maestro Apparel (2019)
 Nike Apparel (2021)
 PT Persigowa Football Klub (2021)
 PT Anugrah Pratama Gowa (2021)

References

External links

Makassar
Sport in South Sulawesi
Football clubs in Indonesia
Football clubs in South Sulawesi
Association football clubs established in 2018
2018 establishments in Indonesia